Cedar Rapids Community School District v. Garret F., 526 U.S. 66 (1999), was a United States Supreme Court case in which the Court ruled that the related services provision in the Individuals with Disabilities Education Act (IDEA) required public school districts to fund "continuous, one-on-one nursing care for disabled children" despite arguments from the school district concerning the costs of the services."  The judges relied heavily on Irving Independent School Dist. v. Tatro. Under the Court's reading of the IDEA's relevant provisions, medical treatments such as suctioning, ventilator checks, catheterization, and others which can be administered by non-physician personnel come within the parameters of the special education law's related services. Disability advocates considered the Court decision to be a "substantial victory for families of children with disabilities." Amendments were made in the Education Flexibility Partnership Act of 1999 to increase IDEA funding as a result of the case.

Background
The Court reasoned in a seven to two decision, that Tatro established the bright-line rule, by which "the services of a physician (other than for diagnostic and evaluation purposes) are subject to the medical services exclusion, but services that can be provided in the school setting by a nurse or qualified layperson are not."

Justices Clarence Thomas and Anthony M. Kennedy dissented, noting that the ruling "blindsides unwary states."

References

External links
 

United States education case law
United States Supreme Court cases
United States Supreme Court cases of the Rehnquist Court
1999 in United States case law
1999 in education
United States disability case law